Azeem Ryan Pitcher (born 31 July 1980) is a Bermudian cricketer, who played with the Bermudian cricket team in their first ever One Day International when they played Canada in May 2006.

References

External links
 

1980 births
Living people
Bermudian cricketers
Bermuda One Day International cricketers